Lemuel Allen Farm is a historic home and farm located in Madison Township, Jefferson County, Indiana.  The farmhouse was built in 1877, and is a -story, central passage plan, vernacular Italianate style brick dwelling. It features a side-gabled roof sheathed in slate shingles with triple-embedded and diamond patterns in red on either side of the front-gable on the façade. Also on the property are the contributing privy and large, transverse-frame basement barn, built around 1877, and a silo, the workshop, the granary, the garage, the feed shed, and a tool shed, all dated to the 1920s.

It was listed on the National Register of Historic Places in 2016.

References

Farms on the National Register of Historic Places in Indiana
Italianate architecture in Indiana
Houses completed in 1877
Buildings and structures in Jefferson County, Indiana
National Register of Historic Places in Jefferson County, Indiana
1877 establishments in Indiana